A Barcala is a comarca in the province of A Coruña, Galicia, Spain. Its capital town is Negreira. It contains two municipalities (Negreira and A Baña) and 10,277 inhabitants (2019) in an area of 213.5 km².

The comarca is located in northwest Spain. It borders three other comarcas: Xallas to the north; Santiago to the south and east; and Noia to the west.

There is the Barcala river (Río Barcala) in the province of A Coruña, Galicia, Spain.

References

Comarcas of the Province of A Coruña